al-Alwa is a village in southern Al-Hasakah Governorate, northeastern Syria.

The village is located on the Khabur River Administratively the village belongs to the Nahiya al-Shaddadah of al-Hasakah District.

The village is predominantly inhabited by Arabs. At the 2004 census, it had a population of 3,409.

References

Villages in al-Hasakah Governorate